Marta Marrero (born May 18, 1969), better known by her stage name Martika, is an American pop singer and actress. She released two internationally successful albums in the late 1980s and early 1990s, which sold over four million copies worldwide. Her biggest hit was "Toy Soldiers", which peaked at #1 for two weeks on the American chart in mid-1989. She is also known for her role as Gloria on Kids Incorporated.

Early life, family and education
Martika was born in Whittier, California to Cuban parents from Havana.

Career

Early career
She entered mainstream show business in an uncredited role as one of the girls in the 1982 motion picture Annie. This led to her being cast as Gloria on the long-running children's show Kids Incorporated as one of a group of neighborhood children who rise to local fame by singing staged productions at a corner malt shop. Once the second season began, she formally adopted her stage name Martika Marrero before shortening it to the mononym Martika, which she has used ever since. Martika and many other Kids Incorporated cast members were featured in the musical numbers from the Mr. T motivational video Be Somebody... or Be Somebody's Fool! in 1984.

Following her role in Kids Incorporated and Be Somebody, Martika was signed by Columbia Records. Her first solo release was released only in Japan: "We are Music" was recorded to promote Sony cassette tapes in the Japanese market, where the song was released in 12", 7" and CD formats.

In 1987, Martika recorded a version of the Michael Jay/Gregory Smith song "Bounce Back", which included a music video which was aired on Entertainment '80, although it was not available for purchase.

Rise to prominence
Her first album, 1988's Martika (No. 15 US), spawned the song "Toy Soldiers", which she co-wrote with her producer Michael Jay and it became a top-5 hit in the United Kingdom, Ireland, Germany, and Australia. In the US, "Toy Soldiers" spent two weeks at No. 1 in 1989. "Toy Soldiers" also went to No. 1 in New Zealand.

Two additional singles also went top 40 in the US: "More Than You Know" (No. 18) and "I Feel the Earth Move" (No. 25), which was a cover of Carole King's song from her album Tapestry. Both of those tracks also hit the top 20 on the US Dance charts and the UK Singles Chart. "I Feel the Earth Move" also reached the top 10 in Australia, New Zealand, and Ireland. A fourth and final single from the album, "Water", entered the lower regions of the UK and Australian charts.

The album was certified platinum in the UK in 1990, and double platinum in Australia.

In 1990, Martika co-wrote the track "Kiss Me Quick" with Michael Jay and Marvin Morrow. The track was recorded by freestyle/pop singer Alisha for her 1990 album Bounce Back, with Martika contributing backing vocals.

1990s
Martika was encouraged by her agent to combine her love of film and music by scoring soundtracks and, in 1990, she wrote and recorded the song "Blue Eyes Are Sensitive to the Light" for the soundtrack to the film Arachnophobia. The producers of the album did not like her vocals, so the song was re-recorded by Sara Hickman for the film. The song has also been recorded by Brazilian singers Deborah Blando (on her 1991 debut, A Different Story), Elba Ramalho, and Frances Ruffelle.

In 1991, Martika approached Prince to do some new tracks. Among these was her second (and last) US Top-10 single, "Love... Thy Will Be Done", which also became a Top-10 hit in the UK and reached No. 1 in Australia.  "Love... Thy Will Be Done" started out as a prayer written by Martika, and Prince then changed it into a song.

Her second album, Martika's Kitchen, peaked at No. 111 on the Billboard Top Albums chart. The title track received only minor airplay in the US, and reached No. 93 on Billboard Hot 100 chart. However, the album was a bigger success abroad, though on a lesser scale than her debut. It peaked at No. 15 in the UK Albums Chart, No. 9 in Australia, and spawned further hits with the songs "Coloured Kisses" and the title track, "Martika's Kitchen". "Temptation", another track from this album, was covered by Patti LaBelle on her album Burnin'.

Martika played the role of the lounge singer Dahlia Mendez in the crime drama TV series Wiseguy in 1990, opposite Steven Bauer who took over from Ken Wahl for the fourth and final season.

She eventually faded from the public eye in 1991/1992 after walking away from the music industry, due to burnout and feeling overwhelmed with the burden of fame.

In 1997, a greatest hits compilation album The Best of Martika: More Than You Know was released.

Re-emergence
During the 2000 explosion of Latin pop, Martika sang backing vocals on various projects and contributed lyrics to releases by other artists, although she failed to receive any major-label attention for herself. Instead, she built martika.net in 2001, a website for her fans, and released a remix of a newly self-recorded song, "The Journey". She also recorded a track  "Monday" for a new solo album which the website stated was on its way. Eventually, however, her website was shut down and the album never materialized.

In 2003, Martika and her husband, musician Michael Mozart, formed the band Oppera. Adopting a Latin pop sound, she and Mozart released Oppera's debut album, Violince, in 2004. Rapper Eminem used a sample of her biggest US hit, "Toy Soldiers", for "Like Toy Soldiers", a track on his 2004 album Encore and featured Martika on the chorus of the track. In response, Martika's British greatest hits album was repackaged with its title altered to Toy Soldiers: The Best of Martika. A biography was added to the album insert reflecting the new Eminem sample, though it asserted that she had not released any albums since Martika's Kitchen.

Oppera released a self-titled second album in 2005. Martika promoted Opperas release with a Borders bookstore tour.

In 2010, Martika, using the stage name Vida Edit, starred as Lolly Pop and co-produced a web-based television action program J8ded.

In October 2011, Martika stopped using the stage name Vida Edit and launched a new personal website. A year later, she announced an Australian tour, but it was canceled. She performed in 2014 alongside Debbie Gibson, Samantha Fox, and Rick Astley at a HitParade Festival in Chile.

In July 2016, she was part of the Totally 80s Tour of Australia. The concerts included seven international 1980s acts, including Martika, Berlin, Limahl of Kajagoogoo, Paul Lekakis, Katrina of Katrina and the Waves, Men Without Hats and Stacey Q. For her performance at the tour, she received positive reviews from the Australian press.

Personal life
As of 2016, Martika was living in Dayton, Ohio with her musician husband, concentrating on married life.

Awards and nominations
{| class="wikitable sortable plainrowheaders" 
|-
! scope="col" | Award
! scope="col" | Year
! scope="col" | Nominee(s)
! scope="col" | Category
! scope="col" | Result
! scope="col" class="unsortable"| 
|-
! scope="row"|ASCAP Pop Music Awards
| 1990 
| "Toy Soldiers"
| Most Performed Song
| 
| 
|-
!scope="row" rowspan=6|Smash Hits Poll Winners Party
| rowspan=2|1989
| rowspan=5|Herself
| Most Fanciable Female
| 
| rowspan=2|
|-
| Most Promising New Solo Artist
| 
|-
| rowspan=4|1991
| Well-Dressed Person
| 
| rowspan=4|
|-
| Best Female Solo Singer
| 
|-
| Worst Female Solo Singer
| 
|-
| "Love... Thy Will Be Done"
| Best Single
|

Discography

Studio albums
 Martika (1988)
 Martika's Kitchen (1991)

with Oppera
 Violince (2004)
 Oppera (2005)

Filmography

References

External links

 
 [ Martika] at AllMusic
 
 
 

1969 births
20th-century American actresses
21st-century American actresses
Living people
Actresses from California
American child actresses
American entertainers of Cuban descent
American women singers
American film actresses
American child singers
American freestyle musicians
American television actresses
Actors from Whittier, California
Singers from California
Musicians from Whittier, California
Columbia Records artists